Narayanrao Vyas (1902–1984) was a Hindustani musician of Gwalior gharana. He was a disciple of Vishnu Digambar Paluskar. He cut several 78 rpm discs, classical khayals and semi-classical bhajans and thumris, at around 1930 which became very famous. His father and uncle were well-known musicians in Kolhapur. Narayanrao's elder brother, Shankarrao Vyas, was also a singer and composer of distinction.

External links
 Courses.nus.edu.sg

1902 births
1984 deaths
Hindustani singers
People from Kolhapur
Recipients of the Sangeet Natak Akademi Award
Gwalior gharana
20th-century Indian singers
20th-century Khyal singers